Laura Roxana Rus (born 1 October 1987) is a Romanian footballer who plays for Beroe in the Bulgarian Women's League. She has also played in the Romanian, Spanish, Danish, South Korean and Italian championships, and she is a member of the Romanian national team.

Career
Rus was born in Bocșa and attended University in Reșița, where she played for the university's handball team. She started her football career playing for Pandurii Targu Jiu in the Liga I. During this time she started playing for the Romanian national team in 2005.

In 2007 she moved abroad, alternating periods in Spain's Sporting Huelva and Cyprus' Apollon Limassol. With Apollon she first played the UEFA Champions League in the 2010–11 season. In 2011, she went on trial with English FA WSL club Everton Ladies, but she ultimately continued in Apollon for two more seasons. In the latter she was the top scorer of the Champions League with 11 goals (with the qualifying rounds included). That summer she moved to Fortuna Hjørring in Denmark's Elitedivisionen, and one year later to South Korea's Icheon Daekyo.

In 2017 she moved back to Spain and Cyprus for third stints with Sporting and Apollon. At the end of 2017 it was announced that she will move to Italy and play for Sassuolo. After the end of the 2017–2018 season, she signed with Hellas Verona, scoring in her first friendly match. At the end of July 2019, Laura signed with RSC Anderlecht, where she will play for the 2019–20 season.

References

External links
 

1987 births
Living people
Romanian women's footballers
Romania women's international footballers
Romanian expatriate sportspeople in Spain
Expatriate women's footballers in Spain
Expatriate women's footballers in Cyprus
Expatriate women's footballers in Denmark
Fortuna Hjørring players
Apollon Ladies F.C. players
Primera División (women) players
Sporting de Huelva players
Women's association football forwards
U.S. Sassuolo Calcio (women) players
Expatriate women's footballers in Italy
Romanian expatriate sportspeople in Italy
Serie A (women's football) players
Hellas Verona Women players
Romanian expatriate sportspeople in Cyprus
Romanian expatriate sportspeople in Denmark
Romanian expatriate sportspeople in South Korea
RSC Anderlecht (women) players
Expatriate women's footballers in Belgium
Romanian expatriate sportspeople in Belgium
WK League players
People from Bocșa